Joe Mercik (born c. 1975) is an American former professional footballer who played for the Rochester Rhinos among other teams. He graduated from Penfield High School in 1993 and went to the University at Buffalo. Following his college soccer career, he was signed by and played for the Rhinos, before leaving the United States to play in Germany. He returned to the USL, playing for the Cincinnati Riverhawks.

References 

http://www.penfieldsoccer.com/About-Us.html

https://www.flickr.com/photos/30680837@N03/4273716031/

1970s births
Living people
American soccer players
Rochester New York FC players
Cincinnati Riverhawks players
Place of birth missing (living people)
Buffalo Bulls men's soccer players
Association footballers not categorized by position